Peter Christian Frølich (born 17 September 1987) is a Norwegian lawyer and politician for the Conservative Party. He was elected to the Norwegian parliament for Hordaland in 2013.

Early life 
Frølich was educated at Bergen Handelsgymnasium, an upper secondary school in Bergen, Norway, from 2003 to 2006.

Frølich was conscripted into the Norwegian Armed Forces from 2006 to 2007.

Frølich attended the University of Bergen from 2007 until 2012, graduating with a Master's degree in Law. During his studies, Frølich worked as a Security officer for G4S.

Career 
Frølich was elected to Bergen City Council in 2011.

In 2013, Frølich started working as an associate lawyer at Norwegian law firm Kluge Advokatfirma.

Parliament 
Frølich was elected as a member of the Norwegian Parliament for Hordaland in the [[2013
Norwegian parliamentary election|2013 election]].

Frølich joined the Standing Committee on Justice in 2013. He was promoted to Second Vice Chair in 2017.

Frølich was re-elected as a member of the Norwegian Parliament for Hordaland County in 2017.

Personal life 
Frølich identified Winston Churchill as his political idol. Frølich is married.

References 

1963 births
Living people
Conservative Party (Norway) politicians
Members of the Storting
Politicians from Bergen
21st-century Norwegian politicians